Johan Albert Brommels (7 February 1891 - 15 June 1962) was a Finnish schoolteacher, journalist and politician.

Background 
He was born in Övermark. His father was Johan Henrik Brommels and his mother was Ulrika Wilhelmina med Mickelsdotter. He was married to Anna Olivia Stenfors in 1915 and had 4 kids.  He started as a school teacher by profession. He taught the elementary school in Vörå  from 1914 -1915, primary school in Bergö from 1915 -1922 and again elementary school in Närpes from 1922 -1955.  

He later worked as postman (1915 -1920) and as locksmith (1915 - 1921) in Bergö. As a journalist, he worked as an editor at Vasa-Posten in 1920 and from 1956 to 1960 in Kaskö Tidning and Syd-Österbotten.

Career 
He was a member of the Parliament of Finland from 1945 to 1951, representing the Swedish People's Party of Finland (SFP). When he served in Parliament, he was a member of the Committee on Education and of the Committee on Economic Affairs. He represented the southern constituency of Vaasa County. He was a presidential elector in 1950 and 1956 and also held positions of trust in Bergö and Närpes Municipal Council. Other positions of trust that he held were as chairman to Southern Ostrobothnia Teacher's Association and as secretary of Southern Ostrobothnia Song and Music Association. Lastly, he also held a position of trust at the Central Board of the Finnish Association of Swedish Primary School Teachers.

References

1891 births
1962 deaths
People from Närpes
People from Vaasa Province (Grand Duchy of Finland)
Finnish Lutherans
Swedish People's Party of Finland politicians
Members of the Parliament of Finland (1945–48)
Members of the Parliament of Finland (1948–51)
Finnish people of World War II
20th-century Lutherans